Sabao (薩保, Sàbǎo, "Protector, Guardian") was an official Chinese title in the 5th-7th centuries CE, used for government-appointed leaders of the Sogdian immigrant-merchant community. The word sabao is derived from the Sogdian word s’rtp’w, "caravan leader". Sabaos also often had titles of "Prefects", with regional responsibilities, in the Chinese administration : An Jia was Sabao and Grand Governor (大都督, Dàdūdū) of Tong Prefecture.

They were in charge of commercial affairs for foreign merchants from Middle Asia doing businesses in China, as well as Zoroastrian affairs. Various Sabaos are known from their epitaphs, such as An Jia, Wirkak or Yu Hong.

The tombs of the Sabaos in China are among the most lavish of the period in this country, and are only slightly inferior to Imperial tombs, suggesting that they were among the wealthiest members of the population.

Tombs of Sabaos

References

Sogdians
Multiculturalism in Asia